Woodson High School may refer to:

 The secondary school of Woodson Independent School District in Woodson, Texas
 H.D. Woodson High School in Washington, D.C.
 Wilbert Tucker Woodson High School in Fairfax County, Virginia